A list of films produced in Hong Kong in 1961:.

1961

References

External links
 IMDB list of Hong Kong films
 Hong Kong films of 1961 at HKcinemamagic.com

1961
Lists of 1961 films by country or language
Films